Indo-Sasanian coinage was major type of coinage of the post-Gupta Empire period, in the areas of Gujarat and Rajasthan in western India and in the Gangetic region, from the 6th century to the 12th century CE. These coins were derived from the Sasanian coinage design, probably transmitted to the subcontinent by the Alchon Huns as they invaded northern India circa 500 CE. They are an important component of Indian coinage.

Design and extent
Indo-Sasanian coins derive from three Sasanian prototypes, which were introduced in western India by the Alchon Huns, also called Hunas by the Indians.

Western and northwestern regions
Indo-Sasanian coinage covers a period of several centuries, during which it is possible to see a progressive degradation and stylisation of the original Sasanian design, in ways which vary according to the region where they were current. Typically, the bust of the king on the obverse is highly simplified and geometric, and the design of the fire altar, with or without the two attendants, appears as a geometrical motif on the reverse of this type of coinage.

This coinage was current among the various polities of Western India succeeding the collapse of the Gupta Empire, such as the Rashtrakuta, Chaulukya and Palas from circa 530 CE to 1202 CE. In the case of the Chaulukyas, these are also often called "Gadhaiya Paise".

Gangetic region
Around the beginning of the 9th century, coin designs derived from the Sasanians were adopted in the Gangetic region: the Vigrahapala drammas of a certain ruler named Vigrahapala, and later the Adivaraha drammas of the Pratihara ruler Bhoja I (c. 836-886 CE).

See also
 Arab–Sasanian coinage
 Sasanian coinage of Sindh

References

Coins of India
Ancient currencies
Economic history of India